Elachista cyanea is a moth of the family Elachistidae. It is found in Australia along the eastern coast form southern Queensland to Burrewarra Point in New South Wales.

The wingspan is 5.2-5.8 mm for males and 5.2-6.4 mm for females. The forewings are blue basally with black scales distally. The hindwings are dark grey.

The larvae feed on Commelina cyanea. They mine the leaves of their host plant.

References

Moths described in 2011
cyanea
Moths of Australia
Taxa named by Lauri Kaila